The Union Election Commission (abbreviated UEC) is the national level electoral commission of Myanmar (Burma), responsible for organising and overseeing elections in Burma, as well as vetting parliamentary candidates and political parties.

Origins
The Union Election Commission is mandated by the Union Election Commission Law, enacted on 8 March 2010.

Members
The UEC's members are appointed by the government, and must meet the following qualifications:
 50 years of age or older
 a good public reputation, as determined by the government
 dignity, integrity and experience
 loyalty to the State and its citizens
 not affiliated to any political parties
 not hold any office or draw compensation as such

2021-present members 
On 2 February 2021, the State Administrative Council, the military regime, appointed military-aligned members to the UEC:

 Thein Soe, Chairman
 U Aung Moe Myint, Member
 Than Tun, Member
 U Kyauk, Member
 Aung Saw Win, Member
 Than Win, Member

2016-2020 members
The UEC's current members, appointed by the President Htin Kyaw on 30 March 2016.
 Hla Thein (Chairman)
 Aung Myint (Member)
 Soe Yae (Member)
 Tun Khin (Member)
 Hla Tint (Member)

Inaugural members 
The UEC appointed by the State Peace and Development Council after 2010 election were:
 Tin Aye (Chairman)
 Myint Naing (Member)
 Aung Myint (Member)
 Dr. Myint Kyi (Member)
 Win Kyi (Member)
 Nyunt Tin (Member)
 Win Ko (Member)
 Tin Tun (Secretary)

Following were appointed as additional members of Union Election Commission later.
 N Zaw Naung 	
 Sai Kham Win 	
 Saw Ba Hlaing 	
 Ha Kee 	
 Dr. Mg Mg Kyi 	
 Sai Non Taung 	
 Sai Htun Thein and 	
 Dr. Sai San Win

List of chairperson
 Thein Soe (8 March 2010 – 30 March 2011)
 Tin Aye (30 March 2011 – 30 March 2016)
 Hla Thein (30 March 2016 – 2 February 2021)
Thein Soe (2 February 2021 – present)

Controversy
The UEC has been criticised for its powers to abolish elections in conflict areas. The UEC's first chairman was Thein Soe, a former major-general, an appointment that was derided by media. On 18 February 2011, Tin Aye, a former lieutenant-general and member of the State Peace and Development Council, was appointed by the Pyidaungsu Hluttaw, to replace Thein Soe.

It has also been criticised by various advocacy groups and the United Nations for its lack of independence and impartiality, in its handling of recent elections. The UN has also noted the UEC's failure to follow up on electoral complaints, including voting procedures.

References

External links
 Official website

Elections in Myanmar
Politics of Myanmar
Government of Myanmar
Myanmar
2010 establishments in Myanmar
Entities related to Myanmar sanctions